The Consolidated Rail Corporation (Conrail) was formed on April 1, 1976 not by a standard merger, but as a new government corporation that took over only designated lines and other rail-related assets from the existing bankrupt companies. Seven major companies were included:
Penn Central Transportation Company (PC), successor to the New York Central Railroad (NYC), New York, New Haven and Hartford Railroad (NH), and Pennsylvania Railroad (PRR)
Erie Lackawanna Railway (EL), successor to the Delaware, Lackawanna and Western Railroad (DL&W) and Erie Railroad (Erie)
Ann Arbor Railroad (AA), controlled by Penn Central
Central Railroad of New Jersey (CNJ)
Lehigh and Hudson River Railway (L&HR)
Lehigh Valley Railroad (LV), controlled by Penn Central
Reading Company (RDG)
So were most railroads that had been leased or controlled by them, sometimes jointly.

Conrail maintained existing leases of the small Amsterdam, Chuctanunda and Northern Railroad (PC-NYC) and Central Railroad of Indianapolis (PC-NYC), as well as the Lehigh and Susquehanna Railroad (LV), owned by the non-railroad Lehigh Coal and Navigation Company. In addition, Conrail acquired long-term leases on several Canadian properties (all PC-NYC): the St. Lawrence and Adirondack Railway, the Canada Southern Railway, and its subsidiaries Detroit River Tunnel Company and Niagara River Bridge Company. All of these Canadian companies but the St. Lawrence and Adirondack were given up in 1985. None of the property of the New York and Harlem Railroad was transferred to Conrail, but a portion was operated under contract as a light-density line.

References

United States Railway Association (USRA), Washington, DC. "The Conveyance Process: A Supplement to the Final Report of the United States Railway Association." December 1986. pp. 7–9, Attachment B.

 

 Conrail
Conrail
Conrail